Kuan (Kuanhua 寬話 宽语), is a poorly classified Austroasiatic language spoken by about 1,000 people in Jinghong County, Xishuangbanna, Yunnan, China. Li (2005) proposes that it is a Mangic language. Other possible affiliations include Palaungic and Khmuic.

References

Mangic languages